Aftercare is the care and treatment of a convalescent patient.

You may be looking for:
Convalescence
Patient
Treatment
Hospital
Surgery

See also 
 Aftercare (BDSM)
 Recidivism (for attention to psychological and addiction treatment options available to released convicts)